In the data warehouse practice of extract, transform, load (ETL), an early fact or early-arriving fact, also known as late-arriving dimension or late-arriving data, denotes the detection of a dimensional natural key during fact table source loading, prior to the assignment of a corresponding primary key or surrogate key in the dimension table.  Hence, the fact which cites the dimension arrives early, relative to the definition of the dimension value.

Handling 
Procedurally, an early fact can be treated several ways:
 As an error: On the presumption that the dimensional attribute values should have been collected before fact source loading
 As a valid fact, pause loading: The collection pauses whilst the missing dimensional attribute value itself is collected
 As a valid fact, load with dummy keys: A primary key value is generated on the dimension with no attributes (stub / dummy row), the fact completes processing, and the dimension attributes are populated (overwritten) later in the load processing on the new row

References

Business intelligence terms
Data warehousing